Paolo Guerrero is the all-time top goalscorer for the Peru national football team. As of 7 October 2021, he has scored 38 goals in 107 appearances, since his debut on 9 October 2004.

Guerrero became the all-time leading goalscorer for Peru on 4 June 2016, after scoring against Haiti in a 1–0 win at the Copa América Centenario.

International goals

Note: In a World Cup qualifier on 10 October 2017 where Peru drew with Colombia 1–1, FIFA's match summary lists Peru's goal as an own goal by David Ospina. CONMEBOL and other sources have had match reports that gave the goal to Guerrero. The goal was a result of an indirect free kick that Guerrero struck on target, and therefore required a touch from Ospina in order to stand. Additionally, FIFA's match report has officially given the goal as an own goal; thus, it is not included in the list above.

Statistics

References

Guerrero, Paolo
Guerrero, Paolo